Aztec Bowl may refer to:
 Aztec Bowl (game), an annual American college football game in Mexico
 Aztec Bowl (stadium), a former stadium at San Diego State University